Lower Garden District is a neighborhood of the city of New Orleans.  A subdistrict of the Central City/Garden District Area, its boundaries as defined by the New Orleans City Planning Commission are: St. Charles Avenue, Felicity, Prytania, Thalia, Magazine, and Julia Streets to the north; the New Orleans Morial Convention Center, Crescent City Connection, and Mississippi River to the east; Felicity Street, Magazine Street, Constance Street, Jackson Avenue, Chippewa Street, Soraparu Street, and St. Thomas Street to the south; and 1st Street to the west.

Geography

It includes the Papillon Apartments, an apartment complex operated by Tulane University for graduate students and their families.

Adjacent neighborhoods
 Central Business District (north)
 Mississippi River (east)
 St. Thomas Development (south)
 Irish Channel (west)
 Garden District (west)
 Central City (west)

Boundaries
The New Orleans City Planning Commission defines the various boundaries of the Lower Garden District with these streets:
St. Charles Avenue, Prytania Street, Felicity Street, Thalia Street, Magazine Street, Julia Street, the New Orleans Morial Convention Center, Crescent City Connection, Mississippi River, Constance Street, Jackson Avenue, Chippewa Street, Soraparu Street, St. Thomas Street, and First Street.

Landmarks
The Lower Garden District is home to a number of historical landmarks, including St. Alphonsus Church.

In 2016, the Pikachu, also known as the Pokemonument,  a fiberglass sculpture depicting the Pokémon species of the same name by an unknown artist, was installed in Lower Garden District.

The  statue of the Japanese icon was erected as an apparent tribute to Pokémon Go on July 31, 2016, in a decommissioned fountain along Terpsichore Street, near Coliseum Square in New Orleans' Lower Garden District. The fiberglass sculpture was coated to look like bronze. The artist wrote '#pokemonument' in concrete near the work's base.

Within a few days, the sculpture was vandalized by someone with a baseball bat.  It was repaired.  Some two weeks after its placement, the "Pokemonument" was removed, and an online statement from the artist said that the artwork would be auctioned to benefit restoration of the park's fountains. The work sold for $2,000.

Demographics
As of the census of 2000, there were 6,116 people, 3,332 households, and 998 families residing in the neighborhood.  The population density was 6,438 /mi2 (2,446 /km2).

As of the census of 2010, there were 6,363 people, 3,843 households, and 994 families residing in the neighborhood.

Education
The Garden District is zoned to schools in the New Orleans Public Schools and the Recovery School District.

ReNEW SciTech Academy, operated by ReNEW Schools, is within the former Laurel Elementary School within the Lower Garden District. After Hurricane Katrina, Laurel was a school directly operated by the RSD. In 2010 Laurel had a performance score of 45, below the "65" score that was considered "academically unacceptable."

The International School of Louisiana (New Orleans International School), one of the two schools in New Orleans that is chartered by the State of Louisiana but is not a part of the RSD, operates the Camp Street Campus, located in the former Andrew Jackson Elementary School in the lower Garden District. This campus opened in 2000. The Center for Education Reform in 2007 ranked the International School as one of the best charters in the United States.

Notable residents
 Mike Williams, singer for Eyehategod, used to live in the Lower Garden District until his house was burned down.
 Jennifer Coolidge, actress who appeared in the American Pie film series and Legally Blonde.

See also

 Neighborhoods in New Orleans

References

External links
"Lower Garden Historic District." (Archive) City of New Orleans Historic Landmarks Commission.

Neighborhoods in New Orleans
Louisiana populated places on the Mississippi River